Mesocestoididae is a family of Cestoda (tapeworms) in the order Cyclophyllidea. Members of this family are gut parasites of small mammals and occasionally birds.

Genera
Two genera are recognised, Mesocestoides and Mesogyna.

References

Cestoda
Platyhelminthes families